Flensburger Schiffbau-Gesellschaft is a German shipbuilding company located in Flensburg. The company trades as Flensburger and is commonly abbreviated FSG.

History

Flensburger Schiffbau-Gesellschaft was founded in 1872 by a group of five local shipowners who previously had all their steamboats built in England as most German shipowners did in the 19th century.

The first ship, the iron tall ship Doris Brodersen, was delivered to one of the founding partners in 1875. The cargo steamer Septima was commissioned a year later.

Since then Flensburger has delivered more than 700 units of different types of cargo steamers and motor vessels and has also built sailing ships, barges, floating dry docks, tankers, fishing vessels, passenger ships, naval ships and even submarines.

Flensburger was acquired by Egon Oldendorff in March 1990 and then sold to the management in December 2008.

Since 1 September 2020, the shipyard is owned by the Tennor Group, controlled by Lars Windhorst. Subsequently, in August 2021 FSG acquired the neighboring Nobiskrug superyacht shipyard, located in Rendsburg.

Ships built by Flensburger (selection)

Historic ships
 Doris Brodersen, first ship built, a tall ship delivered in 1875
 Septima, first steamer delivered 1876
 Deutschland and Bremen, two merchant submarines delivered 1916
 Alrich, cargo ship seized by the Brazilian Navy during World War I and renamed to Parnahyba.

Contemporary ships
Civil transport:
 , a ro-ro ship delivered 2001 to U.N Ro-Ro İşletmeleri A.Ş, a Turkish-based shipping company.
 Three Coastal class ferries for BC Ferries, British Columbia, Canada.
  for the BC Ferries route from Port Hardy to Prince Rupert
 Eight ConRo220 freight ferries for Cobelfret.
 Six RoRo3900 freight ferries for DFDS.
 Eight RoRo3750 freight ferries for Ulosoy Sealines.
 Two ConRo220 freight ferries for Bore Ltd/Rettig Group Ltd.
 Four RoRo2200 freight ferries for Seatruck Ferries.
 MV Loch Seaforth, a ro-ro ship delivered in 2014 to Caledonian MacBrayne, a Scottish ferry company.
 , a ro-ro ship delivered in 2018 to Irish Ferries
 , a ro-ro ship under construction for Brittany Ferries

Naval ships:
 Three Oste class (Type 423) electronic surveillance ships for the German Navy.
 Two Elbe class (Type 404) replenishment ships for the German Navy.
 Two Berlin class (Type 702) replenishment ships for the German Navy.
 Four of six Point class ro-ro strategic transports for the UK Ministry of Defence.

Gallery
A gallery of vessels built by Flensburger.

References

External links

Homepage of Flensburger Schiffbau-Gesellschaft (FSG)
 

Shipbuilding companies of Germany
Vehicle manufacturing companies established in 1872
Defence companies of Germany
Flensburg
1872 establishments in Germany